Xanabad or Khanabad may refer to:

Afghanistan
Khan Abad, a town in Kunduz Province, Afghanistan
Khan Abad District, a district in Kunduz Province, Afghanistan
Khanabad River, in Afghanistan

Azerbaijan
Xanabad, Khojaly, Azerbaijan
Xanabad, Yevlakh, Azerbaijan

Iran
Khanabad, Fars
Khanabad, Hamadan, alternate name of Emamzadeh Abdollah, Hamadan
Khanabad, Isfahan
Khanabad, Dehgolan, Kurdistan Province
Khanabad, Kamyaran, Kurdistan Province
Khanabad, Aligudarz, Lorestan Province
Khanabad, Delfan,  Lorestan Province
Khanabad, Dorud, Lorestan Province
Khanabad, Khorramabad, Lorestan Province
Khanabad, Markazi, alternate name of  Khatamabad, Markazi
Khanabad, Razavi Khorasan

Uzbekistan
Khanabad, alternate name of Xonobod, city in Andijan Province

Pakistan
Khanabad, Azad Kashmir
Khanabad, Gilgit Baltistan